Raúl Hernández may refer to:
Raúl Hernández (rower) (born 1992), Cuban Olympic rower
Raúl Hernández Garrido (born 1964), Spanish playwright
Raúl Lucio Hernández Lechuga, former Mexican drug lord
Raúl Hernández Barrón (1977–2014), deceased Mexican drug lord